François Marthouret (born 12 September 1943) is a French actor.

Selected filmography

Theater

References

External links
 

1943 births
Living people
Male actors from Paris
French male film actors